Jake William Martin (October 27, 1942 – March 14, 2018) was an American football tight end in the National Football League for the Chicago Bears, the Atlanta Falcons, and the Minnesota Vikings.  He played college football at Georgia Tech and was drafted in the second round (21st overall selection) of the 1964 NFL Draft. Martin was subsequently selected by the Atlanta Falcons in the 1966 NFL Expansion Draft.

Martin played high school football at Gainesville High School in Gainesville, Georgia.
He was a teammate of Billy Lothridge both at Gainesville High and Georgia Tech.

Martin died in Cumming, Georgia, on March 14, 2018, he was 75.

References

1942 births
2018 deaths
People from Gainesville, Georgia
Sportspeople from the Atlanta metropolitan area
Players of American football from Georgia (U.S. state)
American football tight ends
Georgia Tech Yellow Jackets football players
Chicago Bears players
Atlanta Falcons players
Minnesota Vikings players